Nasty Habits may refer to:

Film and television
Nasty Habits (film), 1977 film; Glenda Jackson, Melina Mercouri, and Rip Torn; Michael Lindsay-Hogg, Susan Penhaligon
"Nasty Habits" (Once Upon a Time)
"Nasty Habits", a 1998 episode of A Scare at Bedtime
"Nasty Habits", a 1987 episode of Growing Pains
Nasty Habits, truck in Mud bogging

Music
Nasty Habits, an alias of Doc Scott
"Nasty Habits", a song by Oingo Boingo